The N Soundtrack is a soundtrack album for Noggin's teen programming block, The N. It features songs from shows that were airing at the time: Degrassi: The Next Generation (season 5), Beyond the Break (season 1), South of Nowhere (season 1), Instant Star (season 1), and Whistler (season 1).

It was released as a digital download on August 1, 2006, and as a CD on August 29, 2006. The N Soundtrack contains the first recording by Drake.

Track listing

References
Amazon.com profile
CDUniverse profile
iTunes Store (United States) profile

2006 compilation albums
2006 soundtrack albums
Albums produced by Boi-1da
Nickelodeon
Soundtrack compilation albums
Television soundtracks